John Irving Bloom (born January 27, 1953), known by the stage name Joe Bob Briggs, is an American syndicated film critic, writer, actor, and comic performer. He is known for having hosted Joe Bob's Drive-in Theater on The Movie Channel from 1986 to 1996, the TNT television series MonsterVision from 1996 to 2000, and The Last Drive-in with Joe Bob Briggs on Shudder beginning in 2018. In 2019, he was named the Rondo Hatton Classic Horror Awards' Monster Kid of the Year.

Early years
John Irving Bloom was born January 27, 1953, in Dallas, Texas, the son of Thelma Louise (née Berry) and Rudolph Lewis Bloom.

Bloom was raised in Little Rock, Arkansas, and by age 13 was a sportswriter at what was then the Arkansas Democrat. He won a Fred Russell-Grantland Rice Sportswriting Scholarship to Vanderbilt University, in Nashville, Tennessee, where he majored in English and wrote for the student newspaper, The Vanderbilt Hustler. After graduating in 1975. he became a reporter for Dallas Times Herald and later wrote for Texas Monthly magazine. Taking a leave of absence from the newspaper in order to co-write (with Jim Atkinson) his many books, the true crime book Evidence of Love (later adapted as the TV-movie A Killing in a Small Town), he supported himself by writing movie reviews for the paper. There he created the humorous persona of "Joe Bob Briggs" to review exploitation films and other genre movies.

Persona
Bloom's acting persona as "Briggs" is that of an unapologetic redneck Texan with an avowed love of the drive-in theaters. He specializes in humorous but appreciative reviews of B-movies and cult films, which he calls "drive-in movies" (as distinguished from "indoor bullstuff"). In addition to his usual parody of urbane, high-brow movie criticism, his columns characteristically include colorful tales of woman troubles and high-spirited brushes with the law, which inevitably conclude with his rush to catch a movie at a local drive-in, usually with female companionship. "Briggs" revealed in an interview that he intended the character to have an ambiguous sounding name and initially thought of calling himself "Bubba Rodriguez", but was told that the name Rodriguez would be perceived as racist and decided to go with: "The whitest name I could come up with."

The reviews typically end with a brief rating of the movie in question's "high points", including the types of action (represented by nouns naming objects used in fight scenes suffixed with "-Fu"), the number of bodies, number of female breasts bared, the notional number of total pints of blood spilled, and for appropriately untoward movies, a "vomit meter".

A typical review summary might read: 

Originally, Bloom's film reviews as "Briggs" were limited to pictures shown at local drive-ins. Later, after a tongue-in-cheek "battle" with his own convictions in Joe Bob Goes Back to the Drive In, he also began reviewing films released on VHS and DVD.

Reaction to redevelopment of 42nd Street
During the early 1980s, when New York City was in the planning stages of redeveloping its run-down 42nd Street, Times Square area, which included closing many grindhouses showing B-movies on double and triple bills around the clock, as well as many porn theaters, Briggs encouraged a "postcard-Fu" campaign encouraging genre-film fans to write to city officials and pressure them into saving "the one place in New York City you could see a decent drive-in movie".

Television
In 1986, as a result of the stage show, "Briggs" was asked to be a guest host on Drive-in Theater, a late-night B-movie show on The Movie Channel (TMC). This led to his hosting Joe Bob's Drive-in Theater, which ran from 1986 to 1996, It was twice nominated for the industry's CableACE Award. Afterward the show ended, he hosted the TNT network's similar MonsterVision for four years through July 2000.

In the late 1990s, "Briggs" spent two seasons as a commentator on Comedy Central's The Daily Show (under his given name, John Bloom), with a recurring segment called God Stuff. He appears in Frank Henenlotter's documentary Herschell Gordon Lewis – Godfather of Gore.

In 2018, the horror-themed subscription video on demand service Shudder, owned and operated by AMC, signed Briggs for a new series, The Last Drive-in with Joe Bob Briggs, which premiered as a 13-film marathon on July 13, 2018. During the premiere, Shudder's servers crashed as a result of a large number of subscribers attempting to access the show. Shudder streamed two shorter marathons on Thanksgiving and Christmas Day 2018 Beginning in March 2020, the show returned to Briggs' old double-feature format. A second season consisting of 10 films premiered April 24, 2020. Season 3 began April 16, 2021.

"Briggs" was also a commentator for a Fox TV news magazine for two seasons. He also appeared in episodes of the Fox sitcom Married... with Children in season 8 and 9 as Billy Ray Wetnap, co-owner of Pest Boys Pest Control. He also wrote and performed in specials for Fox and Showtime, and collaborated with comedy writer Norman Steinberg on an unproduced NBC sitcom.

Magazine and newspaper writing
"Briggs" has written for Newsweek, National Lampoon, Rolling Stone, Playboy, The Village Voice, and  National Review,

Bloom's two syndicated newspaper columns as "Briggs", "Joe Bob Goes to the Drive-in" and "Joe Bob's America", were picked up by The New York Times Syndicate in the 1990s. For one year he wrote a humorous sex advice column in Penthouse. In 2000, he started writing the "Drive-in" column again, this time for United Press International, along with a second column, "The Vegas Guy", which chronicles Briggs' weekly forays into the casinos of America.

"Briggs" was president of the Trinity Foundation of Dallas, a non-denominational, non-profit public foundation that serves as a religious watchdog group and publishes The Door, a Christian satire magazine, for which "Briggs" was a regular columnist.

Books
Under his given name, John Bloom, he co-wrote (with Jim Atkinson) the nonfiction book Evidence of Love: The Candy Montgomery Story (1984). The book recounts the 1980 Wylie, Texas murder case in which Montgomery killed her ex-lover's wife, Betty Gore, by striking her 41 times with an axe and whose highly publicized trial ended in an unexpected acquittal. The book was adapted into the CBS TV-movie A Killing in a Small Town (1990), starring Barbara Hershey, and is scheduled to be adapted as an HBO Max miniseries, Love and Death.

As "Joe Bob Briggs", Bloom has published five books of satire—Joe Bob Goes to the Drive In, A Guide to Western Civilization, or My Story, Joe Bob Goes Back to the Drive In, The Cosmic Wisdom of Joe Bob Briggs, and Iron Joe Bob, his homage to the men's movement and the nonfiction books Profoundly Disturbing: Shocking Movies That Changed History and Profoundly Erotic: Sexy Movies that Changed History.

In 2016, again under his given name, Bloom wrote the nonfiction book Eccentric Orbits: The Iridium Story in which he traces the conception, development, and launching of the Iridium satellite constellation and the race to save it from destruction.

One-man shows
In July 1985, Bloom's one-man show An Evening with Joe Bob Briggs debuted in Cleveland, Ohio. Later re-titled Joe Bob Dead in Concert for home release, the show evolved into a theatrical piece involving storytelling, comedy and music. The show was performed in more than 50 venues over the next two years, including Carolines on Broadway in New York and regular engagements at Wolfgang's and the Great American Music Hall in San Francisco, as well as at convention centers, theaters, music clubs and other comedy clubs. In 2019, Briggs began performing a new one-man show, How Rednecks Saved Hollywood, at genre film festivals and revival movie houses.

Other
"Briggs" has contributed audio commentaries to DVDs released by Media Blasters and Elite Entertainment including Jesse James Meets Frankenstein's Daughter, The Double-D Avenger, Michael Findlay's Blood Sisters, Warlock Moon, Samurai Cop, I Spit on Your Grave, and several Ray Dennis Steckler films including The Incredibly Strange Creatures Who Stopped Living and Became Mixed-Up Zombies and Blood Shack.

Bloom appeared as himself in the Jonathan Maberry novel Bad Moon Rising (2008). Joe Bob is one of several real-world horror celebrities who are in the fictional town of Pine Deep when monsters attack.

Controversies
In 1985, Briggs wrote a satirical column about the "We Are the World" video. The resulting controversy, which included accusations of racism towards Bloom, ended Bloom's position at the Dallas Times Herald. His syndicated column changed distributors.

Personal life
In May 2020, Bloom contracted COVID-19 but did not make his condition known to the public. Discussing the experience on the podcast Geek Tawk—hosted by his Last Drive-In co-host Diana Prince (Darcy the Mail Girl)—in July 2020, Bloom stated, "Many people have had [COVID-19] and most of them were much worse off than me. [...] I wish everybody thought it was a death sentence, because then everyone would wear the fucking mask and then we would get rid of it."

Bloom was married to Joyce Karns from 1978 until they divorced a year later in 1979. He married Paula Leigh Bowen in 1988.

Filmography

Podcast appearances
"Briggs" appeared on Ken Reid's TV Guidance Counselor podcast on June 16, 2016, as well as the podcasts Frightday on July 11, 2018, Astonishing Legends Podcast on December 9, 2018, and The Last Podcast on the Left on March 28, 2019.
He also appeared on AEW wrestler Chris Jericho's podcast Talk is Jericho.

Notes

References

Bibliography
Evidence of Love: A True Story of Passion and Death in the Suburbs (1984) with Jim Atkinson, 
Joe Bob Goes to the Drive-in (1987), 
A Guide to Western Civilization, or: My Story (1988), 
Joe Bob Goes Back to the Drive-in (1990), 
The Cosmic Wisdom of Joe Bob Briggs (1990), 
Iron Joe Bob (1992), 
Profoundly Disturbing: Shocking Movies that Changed History! (2003), 
Profoundly Erotic: Sexy Movies that Changed History (2005), 
Eccentric Orbits: The Iridium Story (2016),

External links

Official website

ACME Joe Bob Briggs
Interview with Kittenpants.org
Interview at The Onion AV Club

1953 births
Male actors from Arkansas
American film critics
American male film actors
American male television actors
American performance artists
Horror hosts
Journalists from Texas
Living people
Male actors from Little Rock, Arkansas
Male actors from Dallas
People from Grapevine, Texas
Vanderbilt University alumni
Writers from Little Rock, Arkansas